Midnight Special is the second album by jazz/blues vocalist Al Smith featuring saxophonist King Curtis recorded in 1960 and released on the Bluesville label early the following year.

Reception

AllMusic reviewer Alex Henderson stated: "Midnight Special finds Smith backed by a rock-solid quintet ... Smith has a big, full, rich voice, and he uses it to maximum advantage throughout this excellent album ... With the right exposure, Smith might have become a major name in 1960s blues and R&B – he certainly had the chops and the talent. But, unfortunately, he never enjoyed the commercial success that he was most deserving of. Nonetheless, Midnight Special is an album to savor if you're the type of listener who holds classic soul and the blues in equally high regard".

Track listing 
All compositions by Al Smith except where noted
 "I've Been Mistreated" (Eddie Boyd) – 6:56
 "You're a Sweetheart" (Jimmy McHugh, Harold Adamson) – 4:31	
 "Baby Don't Worry 'Bout Me" – 3:31
 "Ride on Midnight Special" – 2:33
 "The Bells" (Joe Hicks) – 4:08
 "Goin' to Alabama" – 3:19
 "I'll Never Let You Go" (Jimmy Wakely) – 3:37
 "I Can't Make It by Myself" – 3:30

Personnel 
 Al Smith – vocals
 King Curtis – tenor saxophone
 Jimmy Lee – guitar
 Robert Banks – organ
 Leonard Gaskin – bass
 Bobby Donaldson – drums

References 

1961 albums
Albums produced by Ozzie Cadena
Albums recorded at Van Gelder Studio
Bluesville Records albums